Charles E. Jenkins was a member of the Wisconsin State Assembly and the New York State Assembly.

Biography
Jenkins was born in Albany, New York. His father, Lemuel Jenkins, was a member of the United States House of Representatives. In 1848, Jenkins moved to Milwaukee, Wisconsin. He died on September 21, 1896 in Yonkers, New York.

Career
Jenkins was a member of the Wisconsin State Assembly from 1850 to 1851. Additionally, he was a Judge of the Milwaukee County, Wisconsin Court from 1854 to 1856. He was a member of the New York State Assembly in 1866.

References

Politicians from Albany, New York
Politicians from Milwaukee
Members of the Wisconsin State Assembly
Members of the New York State Assembly
Wisconsin state court judges
1896 deaths
Year of birth missing
Lawyers from Milwaukee
Lawyers from Albany, New York